Wells State Park may refer to:

 Wells State Park (Massachusetts)
 Wells State Park (Michigan)